Bracebridge may refer to:

Bracebridge, Lincolnshire, England
Nearby: Bracebridge Heath
Bracebridge, Nottinghamshire, England
Bracebridge, Ontario, Canada